Orillia Terriers may refer to:

Orillia Terriers (2013–), in the Georgian Mid-Ontario Junior C Hockey League
Orillia Terriers (senior and intermediate hockey), Allan Cup-winning senior hockey team
Couchiching Terriers, formerly the Orillia Terriers and Travelways, members of the Ontario Junior Hockey League before folding in 2010

See also
 Terrier (disambiguation)